Asclepiodotus of Heraclea was a commander in the army of Perseus of Macedon during the Third Macedonian War, which took place from 171 BC to 168 BC. He was a native of Heraclea in Sintice. He led a contingent of 2000 Gauls in the early stages of the war. Later, he led 10,000 light infantry in the Battle of Pydna.

References 
 Livy, Ab Urbe Condita 42.51
 Livy, Ab Urbe Condita 44.2, 6-7

Antigonid generals
2nd-century BC Macedonians
Third Macedonian War
Year of birth unknown
Place of birth unknown
Year of death unknown
Place of death unknown